Dr. Radius Prawiro, Drs.ec., AK (29 June 1928 in Yogyakarta – 26 May 2005 in Munich) was an Indonesian economist and politician.

Education
The son of Suradi Prawiro, a teacher, Radius attended school in Yogyakarta. In 1942, while still at Middle School he became a cigarette vendor. After finishing school, he continued his education in the Nederlands Economische Hogeschool in Rotterdam, Netherlands. Returning to Indonesia, he completed a doctorate at the Faculty of Economics at the University of Indonesia in Jakarta.

Career
His economic and political career began as the Secretary of the People's Security Committee (Badan Keamanan Rakyat) in Yogyakarta in 1945 and continued as  Liaison Officer (Perwira Markas Tertinggi Perhubungan TRI) in Yogyakarta from 1947 to 1948, was on the Staff of the Military Governor of the Yogyakarta from 1945 to 1951 and worked as a Technical Officer in the National Accounting Office (Pegawai Teknis Direktorat Akuntan Negara) from 1960 to 1965. He then held the position of Deputy Minister for the National Audit Office of Indonesia (Deputi Menteri Pemeriksa Keuangan Negara) (1965), Deputy Minister for the central bank (1965), Governor of the National Bank of Indonesia (1966), Governor of Bank Indonesia (1966–1973), and served concurrently as Governor of the International Monetary Fund and the Vice-Governor of the Asian Development Bank for Indonesia from 1967 to 1971.

Radius became a member of the President's Economic Experts Team, and served as Head of the Governing Committee of the World Bank (1971–1973).  He was then appointed Minister of Trade in both the Second Development Cabinet   and the Third Development Cabinet  (1973–1983), Finance Minister in the Fourth Development Cabinet (1983–1988) and was Coordinating Minister of the Economics, Finance and Industry and Development Supervisory Board from 1993.

He recorded his views of economic policy in Indonesia in a useful book Indonesia's Struggle for Economic Development published in 1998.

Hobbies and family
Radius was both a photographer and a motorcycle enthusiast. His love of motorcycles originated while he was studying in the Netherlands and he only stopped riding bikes for security reasons when appointed Governor of the Bank of Indonesia. Apart from these hobbies, he also enjoyed gardening with his wife, Leonie Supit.

He was an active Christian and was granted an honorary doctorate from the Theologische Universiteit Kampen in the Netherlands for his work for the Indonesian Christian Higher Education Organisation, and for the establishment of an Institute to develop facilities such as libraries and laboratories at Christian educational institutions.

Radius Prawiro had four children with his wife Leonie, many of whom went on to become national figures including: Baktinendra, Loka Manya, Triputra Yusni Prawiro and Pingkan Riani Putri Prawiro. Radius died 26 May 2005 as a result of heart disease.

References

External links
"Radius Prawiro Meninggal Dunia", Liputan 6, 26 May 2005 (Indonesian)
Profil di tokohindonesia.com (Indonesian)
"Radius Prawiro Meninggal Dunia", KOMPAS, 26 May 2005 (Indonesian)
Profil di pdat.co.id (Indonesian)
"Radius Prawiro  Wafat", DetikCom, 26 May 2005 (Indonesian)

1928 births
2005 deaths
Indonesian economists
People from Yogyakarta
University of Indonesia alumni
Indonesian Christians
Finance Ministers of Indonesia
Governors of Bank Indonesia